Walter Skeeles (17 October 1887 – 21 October 1972) was a British gymnast. He competed in the men's team all-around event at the 1908 Summer Olympics.

References

External links
 

1887 births
1972 deaths
British male artistic gymnasts
Olympic gymnasts of Great Britain
Gymnasts at the 1908 Summer Olympics
Sportspeople from London